Pimple Gurav is a neighbourhood situated on the banks of River Pavana in the city of Pune, India.

Geography 
It is located in the northwest part of the city. Pimple Gurav is surrounded by Dapodi and Kasarwadi to the east and to the north, Sangavi to the south, Pimple Saudagar to west and Pimple Nilakh to far southwest. The Pawana River is located to the west.

The neighbourhood lies off National Highway 48 (India). Nearest railway stations are Dapodi railway station and Kasarwadi railway station which fall on Mumbai–Chennai line.

Transport 
The newly developed, six-lane Nashik Phata (on Mumbai-Pune highway)-to-Wakad bypass crosses across northern part of Pimple Gurav, providing connectivity to Pimple Gurav and surrounding areas.

A PMPML bus stand is near the old village, where buses carry passengers to Hadapsar, Katraj, Deccan, Market Yard, Dapodi, Pune Station, Kothrud, Pune Corporation, Akurdi Railway Station, Warje Malwadi, Appa Balwant Chowk and other destinations in Pune.

Nearest railway stations are Dapodi railway station and Kasarwadi railway station which fall on Mumbai–Chennai line.

Religion 
Pimple Gurav is known for its Kerala Guruvayur "Sri Krishna" temple. Devotees regularly visit this temple and chant vedas.
Additionally Lord Bhairavnath Temple is very famous and is visited by a large number of people. Yearly festival (Gaon Jatra) of this place is on "Hanuman Jayanti" in April Month.

Other places 
The Rajmata Jijau Garden (also called Dinosaur Park) features a 40 feet tall statue of a dinosaur.
Do visit the famous Mauli misal house near dinosaur garden.Bhooj Adda, Best Bengali restaurant in Pune.

References 

Neighbourhoods in Pimpri-Chinchwad